Sherry Roberts (born July 29, 1968) is an American politician and a Republican member of the Rhode Island House of Representatives representing District 29 beginning in 2015. She serves as the Deputy Minority Whip of her caucus.

Education
Roberts attended the Community College of Rhode Island and University of Rhode Island.

Electoral record

Personal life 
Roberts is a resident of West Greenwich, Rhode Island.

References

External links
Official page at the Rhode Island General Assembly

Sherry Roberts at Ballotpedia

1968 births
Living people
Republican Party members of the Rhode Island House of Representatives
People from West Greenwich, Rhode Island
Women state legislators in Rhode Island
21st-century American politicians
21st-century American women politicians